The following are characters from the American soap opera Sunset Beach who are notable for their actions or relationships, and are part of a notable families from the series.

Main characters
 Michael Bourne — Jason Winston George
 Ben Evans — Clive Robertson
 Derek Evans — Clive Robertson
 Meg Evans — Susan Ward/Sydney Penny
 Sara Cummings — Lauren Woodland / Shawn Batten
 Caitlin Deschanel — Vanessa Dorman / Kam Heskin
 Cole Deschanel — Ashley Hamilton / Eddie Cibrian
 Virginia Harrison — Dominique Jennings
 Vanessa Hart — Sherri Saum
 Bette Katzenkazrahi — Kathleen Noone
 Gabi Torres — Priscilla Garita
 Casey Mitchum — Timothy Adams
 Annie Richards — Sarah Buxton
 Gregory Richards — Sam Behrens
 Olivia Richards — Lesley-Anne Down
 Sean Richards — Randy Spelling
 Antonio Torres — Nick Kiriazis
 Maria Evans — Christina Chambers
 Ricardo Torres — Hank Cheyne
 Tim Truman — Dax Griffin

Recurring and guest characters

Jude Cavanaugh  
Sean Kanan (August 26, 1999-December 31, 1999)

Jude Cavanaugh entered the world of Sunset Beach in late summer of 1999. He caught the eye of the local citizen Annie Douglas-Richards, a widow who did her best to get her deceased husband's fortune. Jude and Annie started a rocky relationship and eventually ended up together in the final episode. Jude was revealed to be an undercover agent assigned to catch Annie's husband Gregory Richards, a criminal who was presumed dead.

Jude kept the true reason for his arrival a secret and then worked on the case, becoming close to Tobias Richards (family's uncle who later turned out to be Gregory Richards in disguise). Annie and Jude ended up in each other's arms. However, he never got a chance to develop his character more because he was on the show only for five months.

Rae Chang  
Kelly Hu (January 7, 1997-June 5, 1997)

Dr. Rae Chang was introduced in the second episode as a physician, a young doctor. Rae decided to buy a house called Surf Central, and ended up buying it with Casey Mitchum, a young lifeguard. They quickly fell in love, but Rae always put her feelings aside. Meanwhile, she felt pressured by her parents to marry a man they chose for her, Wei-Li Young. Rae pretended to be married to Casey in front of her parents, but eventually gave in to her parents' pressure and left town and married Wei-Lee. Her character was written off only a few months after the premiere.

Eddie Connors  
Peter Barton (January 6, 1997-May 18, 1998, March 19, 1999)

Eddie Connors, a police officer, was presented to us as Annie Douglas' boy-toy. He served her when she wanted, and usually tried to do whatever she needed. Eddie had a crush on his fellow female officer Paula Stevens, but she was not interested. Eddie accidentally saw Paula in a jewelry store, where he was trying to sell Deschanel jewels and win a fortune. He thought Paula suspected him, so he kidnapped her and then hired a rapist to take care of her. Paula's fiancé Ricardo Torres found her, and he had no idea that Eddie was behind the kidnapping. Eddie was also the first person to learn that Cole Deschanel was Elaine Stevens' son.

Eddie left the police force and became a private investigator. In May 1998, he discovered Derek Evans was impersonating his twin Ben Evans and decided to try to blackmail him, leading to Derek murdering him. On March 19, 1999, Eddie returned in one episode along with Del Douglas to greet Francesca Vargas in Hell.

Joan Cummings  
Carol Potter (recurring January 6, 1997-December 11, 1997, contract February 5, 1998-December 31, 1999)

Joan is a typical stay at home mom. She lived in Kansas with her husband, Hank. When her daughter Meg ran away to Sunset Beach at her wedding day, Joan was supportive and often gave her advice. At the beginning of 1998, the Cummings lost their farm and the family was moved to Sunset Beach. Although Joan was officially a regular, she and her husband never had much of a story, and were primarily there to support their daughters, Meg and Sara. Joan and her husband co-created Shock Wave.

Hank Cummings  
John Martin (recurring September 22, 1997-December 11, 1997, contract February 5, 1998-December 31, 1999)

Hank was a typical farmer father who supported his daughters Meg and Sara and his wife Joan. He never had much of a story (although he was on contract) and was mostly included in family scenes. He appeared when Meg returned to Kansas in September 1997, and then later arrived to Sunset Beach to live there with his wife after their farm was destroyed. He opened the Shock Wave restaurant with his wife Joan.

Emily Davis  
Cristi Harris (May 25, 1998-December 31, 1999)

Emily Davis came to Sunset Beach in May 1998 and immediately won the heart of Sean Richards. They met while competing against each other in lifeguard trials, which ended when Sean allowed Emily to win the job. In a matter of days, Emily was shocked to realize that her mother Bette was also is town. They started to build a relationship and over time slowly became closer by facing the usual teenage problems.

During the Rosario Jewels storyline, Emily was blinded by a talisman, but was cured when the curse stopped. Meanwhile, Amy Nielsen was working to try to steal Sean for herself, often using Brad Niklaus in her plots. However Leo Deschanel often came to Emily's rescue. In 1999, Amy bought a voodoo potion to make Sean sleep with her, ending his relationship with Emily. At the end of the show, Amy's lies were exposed and Sean and Emily reunited.

A.J. Deschanel  
Gordon Thomson (May 11, 1998-December 31, 1999)

A legend named A.J. Deschanel was mentioned various times during 1997. It wasn't until 1998 that we learned more about his character. Father of Cole and Leo Deschanel, A.J. entered the world of Sunset Beach when he rescued Olivia Richards from committing suicide. The recently divorced Olivia was A.J's former love, and they soon reunited. Her ex-husband Gregory Richards was A.J.'s primary rival throughout his time on the show, and the two men had constant confrontations.

A.J. had two sons, Cole, who he worked to rebuild a relationship with, and Leo, who was a relatively minor character.  A.J. was also temporarily involved with Francesca Vargas, who was later murdered. A.J. helped Olivia find her lost son, who turned out to be the child her daughter Caitlin Richards Deschanel was raising. In 1999, Olivia' main rival used voodoo potions to make Olivia, a former alcoholic, start drinking again, which led to the breakup of her relationship with A.J. A.J. ended the show on good terms with Olivia, and beginning a romantic relationship with Bette Katzenkazrahi.

Leo Deschanel  
David Mathiessen (July 22, 1998-March 24, 1999)

Although he was a contract character, Leo did not have any major storylines. He first appeared in summer 1998, and became friends with Sean Richards and Emily Davis, and an instant enemy to Amy Nielsen and Brad Niklaus. He also tried to build a stronger relationship with his father, A.J. He left the show in March 1999.

Benjy Evans  
Chase Parker (March 9, 1999-December 31, 1999)

Benjy Evans came to Sunset Beach in March 1999 with Tess Marin, who claimed he was the son of Maria Torres and Ben Evans'. When this was confirmed by paternity tests, he and Tess moved into Ben's house (where Meg and Maria were also living) and was often the reason for fights between them. Eventually, it was revealed that Benjy was Tess Marin and Derek Evans' son, but after Derek was murdered and Tess arrested, Tess allowed Maria to adopt him.

Jimmy Harrison  
V.P. Oliver (March 19, 1997-December 26, 1997)Jeffery Wood (January 23, 1998-March 23, 1999)

Jimmy Harrison was introduced in March 1997 as the son of Virginia Harrison, a villain. During his time on the show, Jimmy was involved in various storylines but did not have his own storyline. He had to cope with the fact that one of his idols, Michael Bourne killed his father Jackson during a gang war. He was always supportive of his mother, who plotted to win Michael for herself. In the beginning of 1998, the character was recast with a younger actor. Jimmy was written out in March 1999 when Virginia was institutionalized.

Tess Marin  
Tracy Melchior (March 9, 1999-December 31, 1999)

Tess Marin came to Sunset Beach in March 1999 with Benjy Evans, who she claimed was the son of Maria Torres and Ben Evans. Tess claimed she had been Maria's best friend and Benjy's nanny during the years Maria was missing (1993–1998).

Tess started to develop a relationship with Tim Truman, but it was later revealed she was working with and romantically involved with Ben's evil twin, Derek Evans, and was using Tim to further their plans. This led to Derek murdering Tim when he discovered Derek's true identity, something Tess felt guilt over (to the point of being haunted by Tim's ghost). During the show's final weeks, Tess was revealed to be Benjy's real mother (with Derek his father), and she and Derek kidnapped several other characters, which led to Derek being killed and Tess arrested. Tess finally agreed to allow Maria to adopt Benjy.

Amy Nielsen  
Krissy Carlson (recurring December 26, 1997-September 1998, contract September 1998-December 31, 1999)

Amy Nielsen (originally Dreyer) was introduced during the Terror Island serial killer storyline in late 1997, when Sean Richards invited her to spend New Year's on a private island. Amy was originally introduced to be a victim for the killer, but producers decided to keep her. Amy suffered not only the trauma of the island, but learned Sean had only invited her because his original choice, Elizabeth, had vanished (killed by the serial killer). On returning to Sunset Beach Amy wanted nothing to do with Sean.

That summer, Amy and Sean were both guests on the ship Neptune, which was hit by a tsunami, trapping various characters. Amy developed feelings for Sean, and plotted (often using her friend  Brad Niklaus to help her) to break up his relationship with Emily Davis and win Sean for herself. Amy was also involved in the Rosario Jewels storyline, when her father, Bernie Nielsen was turned into a skeleton after breaking a curse held by mysterious jewels.

In 1999, Amy succeeded in making Sean sleep with her by drugging him with a voodoo potion bought from Mrs. Moreau, which resulted in Sean and Emily splitting up. However Sean did not pursue a relationship with Amy, even after she stole a nun's habit in order to pretend she was becoming a nun, to show him she was a good person. By the end of the show, Amy accepted she would not have Sean, and started to become closer to Brad, who she realized had been a good friend to her.

Brad Niklaus  
Michael Strickland (recurring June 11, 1998-September 1998, contract September 1998-December 31, 1999)

Brad Niklaus never had much of a story on this show. He came on canvas during the summer of 1998 and was immediately pushed into the hands of Amy Nielsen, for whom Brad would have done anything. Amy was in love with Sean Richards, and she would have done anything to get him. However, Sean was in love with Emily Davis, so Amy plotted to separate them, by using Brad. Brad was known for his lack of smarts, but he constantly competed with others to gain a lifeguard position. Brad often came to Amy's rescue, he always helped her in whatever she needed, but he never got what he actually wanted. Many people despised him because he was Amy's dog. Eventually, when all of Amy's schemes were discovered, in the final episode, it seemed like Amy and Brad were about to become something more than friends.

Tyus Robinson  
Russell Curry (June 19, 1997-December 31, 1999)

Tyus Robinson was one more of the typical soap opera doctors. He never had much of a story for himself, but he was involved in various medical cases. He first came onto canvas as the doctor of Olivia Richards during her pregnancy, and was then involved (although he didn't know it) in the baby switch story. His next storyline involved Vanessa Hart, who had just been poisoned by Virginia Harrison into believing she had Martin's Syndrome.

Tyus tried to cure Vanessa and eventually helped her. He then fell in love with her, although she had always loved Michael Bourne. Meanwhile, Virginia's next plot was even more disgusting. She stole Tyus' sperm and inserted it into Vanessa by using a Turkey baster. Vanessa then got pregnant and it was later revealed that the child was Tyus'. Tyus was ready to be a great father, but before anything could happen, Vanessa lost her child. During the rest of the show, Tyus became closer friends with both Vanessa and Michael.

Elaine Stevens  
Leigh Taylor-Young (January 6, 1997-December 17, 1997)

The character was written out of the show, as she did not prove popular with viewers.

A fun and entertaining person named Elaine Stevens was one of town's favorite citizens. She had her own coffee shop and people respected her, but nobody ever knew the trouble she went through. She had hard time trying to cope with the fact that her daughter Paula chose to marry Ricardo Torres. Also, past came back to haunt her when she realized that her best friends Olivia Richards and Bette Katzenkazrahi helped Del Douglas kidnap her baby Cole Deschanel when she was young.

Cole came to town in 1997 and soon they both found out the truth. Elaine dug up Cole's grave and it was empty. She felt betrayed by her friends. It was also discovered later that Elaine was the one who murdered Del Douglas. Fortunately, Gregory Richards saved her at court, and at the end of 1997, Elaine left town with her daughter. Sadly, her departure was never addressed or seen on-screen.

Paula Stevens  
Laura Harring (January 6, 1997-December 17, 1997)

Harring enjoyed playing Paula. She told a reporter from Inside Soap that "she's very strong-willed, independent, smart and sexy. And she's madly in love with Ricardo, so there are lots of love scenes." Though Harring disliked the fact that writers portrayed Paula as being naive at times.

In one storyline Paula is kidnapped by Ralph Myers. Harring was delighted to be entrusted with a challenging story. She explained that "I was actually feeling all the dark and scary emotions while I was acting out those scenes." The scenes were that "gruelling" that Harring was still "shaky" and unable to sleep when she went home. On-screen Paula struggles to regain her old self-confidence back following her ordeal. The character was written out of the serial after she failed to win over viewers. Harring commented, "It's been an adventure, an invaluable experience and a lot of fun." 

Paula Stevens, a beautiful and intelligent police officer, was leading her normal life and everything was going fine. She just got engaged to Ricardo Torres, a fellow police officer, but there was something that was about to ruin everything. Her mother Elaine turned out to be the murderer of Del Douglas.

When she went through a few pre-marriage problems, Eddie Connors tried to seduce her, but she rejected him, so he decided to teach her a lesson by paying Ralph, a criminal, to kidnap and rape her. Ricardo went through hard time trying to find his fiancé. She was barely saved from a van filled with gas. The next few weeks she spent trying to deal with the rape and putting Ralph behind bars. However, that was not the only thing that was bothering her.

During her kidnapping, Ricardo met Gabi Martinez, an attractive woman who spent a night with Ricardo and then later it turned out that Gabi was Paula's sister. Gabi, who slept with Ricardo, was confused after they had sex and eventually accused Ricardo of raping her. For Paula, it was something that she just couldn't get through. Although it was proven that Ricardo was innocent, Paula decided to leave town by the end of 1997. Her departure was noticed yet at the end of January.

Tiffany Thorne  
Adrienne Frantz (January 6, 1997-May 15, 1997)Jennifer Banko-Stewart (May 20, 1997-August 29, 1997)

Tiffany Thorne was a teenage runaway introduced in the first episode. She was a rebel from the beginning, and she always tried to do what's best for her. Already in the first episode, she stole a bag from Meg Cummings and then used the letter inside to play with Ben Evans's mind. She fell in love with Sean Richards and Mark Wolper fell in love with her. The triangle was broken off in just a few months when the writers decided to write out Tiffany due to a lack of storyline. Sean's mother Olivia Richards gave her money to leave town.

Carmen Torres  
Margarita Cordova (December 23, 1997-December 31, 1999)

Carmen Torres was a person who never trusted people. She was a fortune teller, a person who believed in God and did the best for her children. She premiered in December 1997, when Gabi Martinez, Vanessa Hart and Meg Cummings came to have a little fun and learn what was in their future. It was later revealed that Carmen knew Ben Evans and that Ricardo Torres was her son.

When Ricardo and Gabi became closer again, Carmen didn't trust her, and she constantly tried to convince Ricardo to leave Gabi, mostly because her tarot cards told her so. Her daughter Maria was presumed dead in 1993, and her other son Antonio is a priest living far away. Carmen's life turned around when her son Antonio returned to Sunset Beach and fell in love with Gabi, with whom he slept on the night they thought they would die. Carmen knew of the affair and tried to warn Ricardo without breaking his heart. Also, her daughter Maria returned from the dead in September 1998.

Carmen refused not to believe in her tarot cards. She realized that Gabi had an affair with someone, but she didn't know who it was with. Gabi and Antonio destroyed the tape, only to learn later that they destroyed the wrong tape. Carmen watched it and realized that her own son had an affair with Gabi. Ricardo and Gabi decided to get married, and Carmen did her best to blackmail Gabi to leave Ricardo. The wedding didn't go through, but Ricardo and Gabi stayed together. Carmen always supported her sons and her daughter and always tried to do the best for her family.

Francesca Vargas  
Lisa Guerrero (July 16, 1998-March 19, 1999)

It came as a shock for Cole Deschanel to encounter his ex-lover and a fellow jewel thief Francesca Vargas on the boat that had the same destiny as the Titanic. As much as he reminisced about the old days, Cole wanted Francesca out of his life, mostly to protect his marriage to Caitlin Deschanel. However, it was then when Francesca decided to play the game her way. At the time, she was married to Phillip Vargas, but it seemed like her marriage was everything but peaceful. During that storyline, her husband was killed, and Francesca, without having anything to do, decided to move to Sunset Beach to pursue her old love and new opportunities.

However, it was obvious nobody actually liked her. Francesca always did things the wrong way. She constantly blackmailed people with evidence she collected to get what she wanted. She found a tape of Gabi Martinez and Father Antonio Torres having sex in an exploding building, and blackmailed them with it. She was, at the time, involved in the Rosario Jewels storyline. Also, the tension between Francesca and Caitlin was rising.

Cole tried to convince Francesca to leave Sunset Beach various times, but she always refused the deal. Even A.J. Deschanel, who tried to convince her to do what's right, couldn't get through to her. Francesca, who also learned about various other plots, soon became everyone's enemy. She even became an ally of Gregory Richards, Caitlin's father. In March 1999, Francesca was shot at and ended up in a hospital (after jumping out a cake wounded). However, she couldn't gain enough strength to confess about who murdered her. On her way to Hell, Francesca was greeted by Del Douglas and Eddie Connors, also murder victims. It was later revealed that Francesca was murdered by Gregory.

Mark Wolper  
Nick Stabile (January 6, 1997-January 20, 1998)

A D.J., a waiter, and a nice person is what Mark was. He was fun, good to everyone and a best friend to many. He moved into Surf Central along with Casey, Rae, Meg and Michael. He fell in love with Tiffany Thorne, but their love was never meant to be because she only had eyes for Sean Richards. he was friends with Meg Cummings. They were always close, but she was in love with Ben. The writers decided to kill him off during the Terror Island storyline in January 1998. He showed interest in Gabi Martinez too, but they never got a chance to explore that story.

References

Lists of actors by soap opera television series
 3
Lists of soap opera characters by series